Thomas Creed may refer to:

 Thomas Creede (fl. 1593–1617), English printer
 Thomas Percival Creed (1897–1969), lawyer and educationist